Jorović is a Serbian surname. Notable people with the surname include:

Branko Jorović (born 1981), Serbian basketball coach and former player
Ivana Jorović (born 1997), Serbian tennis player

Serbian surnames
Patronymic surnames